WBKX (96.5 FM) is a radio station that is based in Dunkirk, New York and also broadcasts at 100.3 FM (via translator W262BX) in Jamestown, New York. The station, along with WDOE, is owned by Alan Bishop and George Kimble.

The station broadcasts a country music format  at 96.5 MHz in Dunkirk and 100.3 MHz in Jamestown and is branded as "Kix Country." The station broadcasts a local morning show hosted by Mark James. Other dayparts use the Waitt Radio 24-hour format.

The station was originally known as WCQA, 96.5 "The Bull," also under a country format. Said format was adopted after the demise of the station's longtime country outlet, WBUZ. (Shortly before WBUZ's end, WCQA submitted a petition to the Federal Communications Commission (FCC) to move to the Jamestown, New York suburb of Falconer; however, it was rescinded when WBUZ failed, leaving Dunkirk with WCQA as the lone commercial radio station.) However, after 2000, the station shifted to a satellite adult contemporary format from ABC and changed their branding to "96 Kix". After a few years, and numerous complaints, WBKX decided to revert to the country format in 2006. In 2009, WBKX began simulcasting at 100.3 FM to make a big competition in Jamestown competing with WHUG "My Country 101.9".

External links
WBKX official website
WBKX

BKX
Country radio stations in the United States